Condat-sur-Trincou is a commune in the Dordogne department in Nouvelle-Aquitaine in southwestern France.

Geography
The village lies on the right bank of the Trincou, which flows southwest through the northern part of the commune, before to flow into the Côle.

The Côle flows west through the middle of the commune, forms part of its southwestern border, then flows into the Dronne, which forms part of the commune's western border.

Population

See also
Communes of the Dordogne department

References

Communes of Dordogne